Beyond the Darklands is the name of two related television series:

Beyond the Darklands (Australian TV series)
Beyond the Darklands (New Zealand TV series)